Peter Clement Bartrum (1907 in Hampstead, London, England — 14 August 2008) was a researcher and genealogist who, from the 1930s onwards, specialised in the genealogy of the Welsh nobility of the Middle Ages.

Educated at Queen's College, Oxford, he began his career as a meteorologist. Although an Englishman by birth, he developed a lifelong interest in the history and genealogy of the royal families and nobility of mediaeval Wales. He learned to read the Welsh language and went on to publish a compendious series of volumes containing the edited texts of medieval Welsh genealogical tracts and his own detailed reconstructions of family lines. His work is now an essential resource for any serious student of early and medieval Welsh history.

Much of his work has been made available online.

Bibliography
Early Welsh Genealogical Tracts (1966)
Welsh Genealogies AD 300–1400 (1974)
Welsh Genealogies AD 1400–1500 (1983)

References

1907 births
2008 deaths
Alumni of The Queen's College, Oxford
British genealogists
British centenarians
Men centenarians
Celtic studies scholars
History of Wales
People from Hampstead